El Mergis (Af Soomaali Ceel Merjis) is a village located in the southern Gedo region of Somalia - about 258 mi (or 416 km) West of Mogadishu, the seat of the Somali government.

El Mergis is on the west side of Juba River.

The closest airport is Bardera Airport with a distance of 56.1 mi (or 90.3 km) north-east of the centre of El Mergis. There are numerous villages in Bardera District from all around Bardera City and most lay down south towards Anoole and Hareeri east of Juba River while west side has less villages and main ones are Fafahdhun, El Mergis and Uar Esgudud.

References

External links
1. El Mergis Population
2. UNOCHA Bardera District Villages

Populated places in Gedo
Jubba River